Container City is the name given to two pieces of shipping container architecture on the Leamouth Peninsula. It is principally a means of utilising standard forty-foot equivalent unit shipping containers, at the end of their life, to produce flexible accommodation and offices at low cost.

A number of buildings have been installed using this method, primarily in East London. The first (Container City I) was installed in 2001, in four days, and fitted out over five months, at Trinity Buoy Wharf, in the London Borough of Tower Hamlets. This was expanded with a second phase (Container City II) in 2002 and offices were constructed on the same site in the Riverside Building in 2005.

A similar technique was used in Container Learn, a 2001 project for Tower Hamlets College, providing twelve extra classrooms on a site with limited space and completed in the time between terms.

The name is a trademark of "Urban Space Management". The company have now completed sixteen projects utilising the technique, which is suited to short and medium term land use – when the land becomes required for other uses, the containers can be reused elsewhere.

Gallery

External links 

 Container Architecture from concept to construction
 Boxing clever The Guardian January 14, 2004
 Container City website

Buildings and structures in the London Borough of Tower Hamlets
House styles
Housing in London
Shipping containers
Residential buildings completed in 2001